South High School was a public high school located in Cleveland, Ohio in the historic Slavic Village neighborhood.  It was part of the Cleveland Metropolitan School District.  Opened in 1894, it was the second high school established in the city.   Their nickname was the Flyers. In June 2010 South High was closed by the 2010 Academic Transformation Plan that was issued by the Cleveland Public School System. Among the school's notable students was Hank Ruszkowski, who went on to play catcher for the Cleveland Indians baseball team.

Ohio High School Athletic Association State Championships
 Baseball - 1961

Notes and references

External links
 District Website
South High School yearbooks available on Cleveland Public Library Digital Gallery, various years 1907 to 2010

Defunct schools in Ohio
High schools in Cuyahoga County, Ohio
National Register of Historic Places in Cleveland, Ohio
Education in Cleveland
Slavic Village
Public high schools in Ohio
Cleveland Metropolitan School District
Educational institutions disestablished in 2010
2010 disestablishments in Ohio
1984 establishments in Ohio
Educational institutions established in 1984